"Open Road" is the first single from Canadian singer Bryan Adams' 10th studio album, Room Service (2004). The single reached number one in Hungary, number 17 in Switzerland, and number 21 on the UK Singles Chart. The music video was set in a traffic jam in a car.

Music video
The music video was filmed in Toronto, Canada.

Track listings
UK CD single
 "Open Road"
 "Blessing in Disguise"
 "Friday Night in London"

European CD single
 "Open Road"
 "Blessing In Disguise"

Charts

Weekly charts

Year-end charts

References

2004 singles
2004 songs
Bryan Adams songs
Number-one singles in Hungary
Polydor Records singles
Songs written by Bryan Adams
Songs written by Eliot Kennedy